The  Caspian tit (Poecile hyrcanus) is a passerine bird in the tit family. It breeds in the deciduous mountain forests of northern Iran, just extending into Azerbaijan.

The sexes are similar, but juveniles are somewhat duller. The most common call of this generally quiet bird is a thin zsit, but a nasal double note, chev chev, is also given.

Both sexes excavate the nesting hole in a live or a rotten tree. Most nests examined are cups of felted material, such as fur, hair and wood chips, but feathers are sometimes used. The number of eggs varies from five to seven, white with faint reddish spots or blotches. It feeds on caterpillars, insects and seeds, much like other tits.

Molecular phylogenetic studies have shown that the Caspian tit is sister to the willow tit (Poecile montanus).

References

Harrap, S., & Quinn, D. (1996). Tits, Nuthatches and Treecreepers. Christopher Helm. 

Poecile
Birds of Azerbaijan
Birds of the Middle East
Birds described in 1905